Jorge Santos Silva, usually known as Jorge or Jou Silva (born 23 April 1987, in Brazil), is a Brazilian football player who plays as a forward for Nadur Youngsters.

He played for Grêmio as a youth. He played for South Korean club Daegu and Rio Claro prior to joining Maltese club Vittoriosa Stars.

On 4 May 2018, he signed a Contract with Malaysian club Johor Darul Ta'zim.

References

External links

1987 births
Living people
Brazilian footballers
Brazilian expatriate footballers
Grêmio Foot-Ball Porto Alegrense players
Daegu FC players
Rio Claro Futebol Clube players
Clube Atlético Metropolitano players
Vittoriosa Stars F.C. players
Sliema Wanderers F.C. players
Birkirkara F.C. players
Club Athletico Paranaense players
América Futebol Clube (RN) players
Tarxien Rainbows F.C. players
Naxxar Lions F.C. players
Hibernians F.C. players
Al Batin FC players
Johor Darul Ta'zim F.C. players
Fujairah FC players
Al-Qadsiah FC players
Al-Tai FC players
Nadur Youngsters F.C. players
K League 1 players
UAE Pro League players
Saudi Professional League players
Saudi First Division League players
Maltese Premier League players
Malaysia Premier League players
Expatriate footballers in Malta
Brazilian expatriate sportspeople in Malta
Expatriate footballers in South Korea
Brazilian expatriate sportspeople in South Korea
Expatriate footballers in Saudi Arabia
Brazilian expatriate sportspeople in Saudi Arabia
Expatriate footballers in the United Arab Emirates
Brazilian expatriate sportspeople in the United Arab Emirates
Expatriate footballers in Malaysia
Brazilian expatriate sportspeople in Malaysia
Association football forwards